Triệu Hán Minh (born June 9, 1987) is a Vietnamese professional basketball player who currently plays for the Saigon Heat of the Vietnam Basketball Association (VBA).

Pro career

Saigon Heat (ABL)
In 2012, Hán Minh joined the Heat before the club's inaugural season in the ABL.

Hochiminh City Wings (2016–2017)

Hán Minh joined the Hochiminh City Wings for the VBA's inaugural season. He finished with averages of 10.9 points, 3.1 rebounds, and 2.5 assists per game.

Career statistics

VBA

|-
| style="text-align:left;"| 2016
| style="text-align:left;"| Hochiminh City
| 14 || 3 || 26.3  || .370 || .320 || .790 || 3.1 || 2.5 || 1 || .0 || 10.9
|- class"sortbottom"
| style="text-align:left;"| 2017
| style="text-align:left;"| Hochiminh City
| 15 || 13 || 29 || .350 || .260 || .800 || 4.3 || 2.5 || 1.3 || .1 || 10
|- class"sortbottom"
| style="text-align:left;"| 2018
| style="text-align:left;"| Saigon Heat
| 17 || 16 || 32.4  || .440 || .430 || .770 || 3.8 || 2.3 || .9 || .0 || 13
|- class"sortbottom"
| style="text-align:center;" colspan="2"| Career
| 46 || 32 || 29.2 || .390 || .340 || .790 || 3.7 || 2.4 || 1. || .0 || 11.3

References

External links
 Career statistics and player information from ASEANBasketballLeague.com

1985 births
Living people
Vietnamese basketball players
Saigon Heat players
Shooting guards
Sportspeople from Ho Chi Minh City